KQUL is a radio station airing a classic hits format licensed to Lake Ozark, Missouri, broadcasting on 102.7 MHz FM.  The station is owned by Harbit Communications, Inc.

References

External links

Classic hits radio stations in the United States
QUL